Gudbrandsdalsmål or Dølamål is a group of Norwegian dialects traditionally spoken in the traditional district Gudbrandsdalen, Oppland.

Phonology

Citations

Notes

References

Literature

 
 
 
 
 
 

Gudbrandsdalen
Norwegian dialects